Culture11, also stylized Culture 11, was a short-lived right-leaning American online magazine active from August 27, 2008, until January 27, 2009. It portrayed itself as a "center-right Slate", with a focus on cultural and media criticism. It was founded by William Bennett and run by David Kuo. Despite rumors that the site had enough funding to last through 2010, it shut down on January 27, 2009, after running out of the money it had raised, and after its investors also lost considerable assets due to the financial crisis of 2007–2008. Among the alumni of Culture11 are Conor Friedersdorf, who served as its features editor, Peter Suderman, who was its arts editor, and James Poulos, who served as its political editor and went on to become the managing editor of Ricochet.

References

Conservative magazines published in the United States
American conservative websites
Online magazines published in the United States
Defunct political magazines published in the United States
Magazines established in 2008
Magazines disestablished in 2009